Lauri Lahesalu (born 29 March 1979) is an Estonian former professional ice hockey defenseman.

Lahesalu won the Ligue Magnus as a member of Dragons de Rouen in 2013. He also represented Estonia in international hockey competitions, serving as team captain.

Career statistics

Regular season and playoffs

International statistics

Awards and achievements

References

External links

1979 births
Living people
Sportspeople from Tallinn
Estonian ice hockey defencemen
Jokipojat players
TuTo players
Hokki players
Oulun Kärpät players
Odense Bulldogs players
Ducs d'Angers players
Dragons de Rouen players
Expatriate ice hockey players in Finland
Expatriate ice hockey players in Denmark
Expatriate ice hockey players in France
Estonian expatriate ice hockey people
Estonian expatriate sportspeople in France
Estonian expatriate sportspeople in Finland
Estonian expatriate sportspeople in Denmark